The Catholic Patriotic Association, abbreviated CPA, is a state-sanctioned organization of Catholicism in the People's Republic of China. It was established in 1957 after a group of Chinese Catholics met in Beijing with officials from the Chinese Communist Party (CCP) and the Religious Affairs Bureau. It is the main organizational body of Catholics in China officially recognized by the Chinese government. It is not recognized by the Vatican. The organization is overseen by the CCP's United Front Work Department (UFWD) following the State Administration for Religious Affairs' absorption into the UFWD in 2018.

The CPA does not oversee Catholics in Macau and Hong Kong.

History
After the establishment of the People's Republic of China in 1949, the Chinese Communist Party sought for ways to bring religions in alignment with the communist cause. While all religions were seen as superstitious, Christianity had the added challenge of being foreign. 

Efforts were made by Chinese Protestants in May 1950 in a meeting with Premier Zhou Enlai. This resulted in the penning of the "Christian Manifesto" that condemned foreign imperialism and argued for building a Chinese Protestant church apart from foreign control. This was based in part on earlier Protestant missiological strategy of creating an indigenous church based on the so-called "three-self principles": self-government, self-support, and self-propagation.

In December 1950, Chinese Catholics followed suit, with Father Wang Liangzuo in north Sichuan province, penning the "Guangyuan Manifesto" and signed by some 500 Catholics. It declared:

Other Catholic manifestos followed, such as the "Chongqing Manifesto" published in January 1951 with over 700 signatures. Similar to the Protestant "Christian Manifesto," the Catholic manifestos spoke of the need for a "three-self" or "three-autonomies" (as it was translated into English), even though this was previously only part of the Protestant missiological literature and not discussed among Catholic missionaries. Premier Zhou Enlai met with Chinese Catholics and spoke of his appreciation for the sacrifices of the Catholic Church and its missionaries, and the need to remain united with Rome on spiritual matters. But he also encouraged the development of the "three-self." Pope Pius XII issued Cupimus Imprimis (1952) and Ad Sinarum Gentes (1954) praising Chinese Catholics for their loyalty and underscoring the importance of martyrdom. Ad Sinarum Gentes additionally spoke out against the "three-self," arguing that independence would make a church no longer "Catholic."

In July 1957, 241 Chinese Catholics from all parts of China, including laity, priests, and bishops, convened a meeting in Beijing with officials from the Chinese Communist Party and the Religious Affairs Bureau. They approved the creation of the Catholic Patriotic Association with Archbishop Ignatius Pi Shushi of Shenyang elected as president. By early 1958, the first Catholic bishops were illicitly appointed without reference to Rome or the Pope. In June 1958, Pope Pius XII issued Ad Apostolorum Principis, refusing to recognize any consecrations performed without prior Vatican approval. The question of consecrating bishops would be a major sticking point in Sino-Vatican relations ever since.

With the rise of the Anti-Rightist Campaign and the Cultural Revolution, all public religious activities came to an end and organizations like the CPA were shutdown. However, as Deng Xiaoping's reforms enabled a restoration of religions in the 1980s, the CPA once again became the official state-sanctioned organization for Catholicism in China. A sizable population of Chinese Catholics remain as part of the so-called "underground church," seen as "Vatican loyalists," and who boycotting masses said by CPA priests.

The CPA does not recognize the proclamation of the dogma of the Assumption of the Blessed Virgin Mary by Pope Pius XII in 1950, canonizations from 1949 onward (e.g. the canonization of Pope Pius X), Vatican declarations on even well-established devotional piety (e.g. on the Sacred Heart of Jesus or on Mary as Queen), and the Second Vatican Council (1962–1965). In practice, however, the Catholic Church in China uses Chinese translations of the documents of the Second Vatican Council, of the 1983 Code of Canon Law, of the 1992 Catechism of the Catholic Church (revised in 1997) and of the 1970 Roman Missal. These had at first to be imported from Taiwan and Hong Kong, but have been printed locally for some years.

In 2018, the CPA's parent organization, the State Administration for Religious Affairs, was absorbed into the CCP's United Front Work Department.

Appointment of bishops

In 1978, Pope Paul VI offered a special faculty that opened up the possibility of bishops in the underground church to appoint new bishops. This was particularly important during a time when the last Vatican-approved bishops occurred in the 1950s three decades earlier. Peter Joseph Fan Xueyan, the Bishop of Baoding, in 1981 became the first to make use of this special faculty and consecrated three bishops without any prior approval from the Holy See. The Pope John Paul II retrospectively gave approval for Fan's actions, and gave further authority to Fan to consecrate more bishops without prior consent. However, given the dire situation of the Catholic Church in China, Pope John Paul II gave permission to five bishops belonging to the underground church and four bishops connected to the CPA, all of whom were consecrated bishop between 1949 and 1955, the authority to appoint new bishops without prior approval. It was precisely in that period that bishops ordained according to CPA rules began to request and obtain recognition from the Holy See.

In June 2007, fifty years after the establishment of the Catholic Patriotic Association, Pope Benedict XVI made publicly available a letter to the Church in China underscoring the importance of unity and outlining a willingness to engage in “respectful and constructive dialogue” with Chinese bishops and government authorities. Following the letter, five new bishops associated with the Catholic Patriotic Association were ordained in 2007, all with papal and Chinese government approval.

In September 2018, a provisional agreement was signed between the Vatican and the Chinese government that stipulated China would recommend bishops for papal approval and that the pope had the ability to veto any recommendations. Pope Francis also recognized seven bishops of the Catholic Patriotic Association who were previously not in communion with the Vatican. Some have raised concerns that the agreement would divide Catholics across China because it offers more control to the Chinese government. Among the most outspoken critics has been the Hong Kong Cardinal Joseph Zen who published an opinion piece in The New York Times entitled “The Pope Doesn’t Understand China,” and asserting that this attempt at unifying the Chinese church will instead lead to the “annihilation of the real Church in China.” While the agreement has generally been recognized as far from perfect, it is also seen by Pope Francis as a step towards healing and the task of evangelization.

In October 2022, the agreement was renewed for another two years. In November 2022, the Vatican accused the Chinese government of violating the terms of the agreement.

Other state-sanctioned religious organizations
The CPA is one of five state-sanctioned religious organizations set up in China after 1949. The others are the Protestant Three-Self Patriotic Movement, the Chinese Taoist Association,  the Buddhist Association of China, and the Islamic Association of China.

See also

Underground church
Religion in China
Christianity in China
Catholic Church in China
Chinese Regional Bishops' Conference of Taiwan
Catholic Church in Macau and Catholic Church in Hong Kong
Separation of church and state

References

Notes

Bibliography

External links
 

 
Christian organizations established in 1957
Catholicism in China
Christianity in China
Patriotism
1957 establishments in China
Organizations associated with the Chinese Communist Party